Giuseppe "Billy" Reina (born 15 April 1972) is a German former professional footballer who played as a striker. He spent nine seasons in the Bundesliga with Arminia Bielefeld, Borussia Dortmund and Hertha BSC.

Career
Reina was born in Unna.

For the 2005–06 season, he joined Sportfreunde Siegen who played in the 2. Bundesliga at the time.

Arminia Bielefeld contract
Whilst signing for Arminia Bielefeld, Reina had an unusual stipulation inserted into his contract stating the club must build a new house for him every year he spent with them. Because the type or size of the houses were not specified, the club and Reina had a legal disagreement and settled the case out of court.

Honours
Borussia Dortmund
 Bundesliga: 2001–02

References

1972 births
Living people
People from Unna
Sportspeople from Arnsberg (region)
Association football forwards
German footballers
SG Wattenscheid 09 players
Arminia Bielefeld players
Borussia Dortmund players
Hertha BSC players
Sportfreunde Siegen players
Bundesliga players
2. Bundesliga players
Footballers from North Rhine-Westphalia